Ctenucha fosteri is a moth of the family Erebidae.

References

fosteri
Moths described in 1912